Matthias Theisen (sometimes spelled Mathias, August 24, 1833 – March 23, 1923) was an American farmer from Roxbury, Wisconsin who served as a member of the Wisconsin State Assembly in 1879. Additionally, he chaired the town board (similar to city council) and was Town Treasurer of Roxbury, Wisconsin. He was a Democrat.

Background  
Theisen was born on August 24, 1833 in Trimport, in the Rhine Province of the Kingdom of Prussia. In August 1851, his parents Johann (John) Theisen (1805–1881) and Maria Anna (Mary A.) Theisen (1805–1883) emigrated to the United States, bringing Matthias and his brother Nicholas. The family settled on a farm in Section 16 of the Town of Roxbury. Matthias married Elizabeth Coch, also a native of Prussia. As of 1880, the Theisens and their families (including Matthias and Elizabeth's seven children) all still lived on the homestead, by that time 175 acres in extent.

Public office 
Theisen had been town treasurer and chairman of the town board for a series of years when he was elected in 1878 from Dane County's 1st Assembly district to succeeded fellow Democrat John Lyle, who was not running for re-election. He received 1,690 votes against 1,217 for Republican John McKenzie, and 442 for Greenbacker L. P. Edwin. He was assigned to the standing committee on agriculture. He did not seek re-election in 1879, and was succeeded by another Democrat, John H. Tierney.

Later years 
Theisen was interviewed as part of a 1920 Wisconsin Magazine of History article, and is described as "wonderfully vigorous in mind and body for one of his years"; he was by then 86 years old, and living in Sauk City.

References

External links

City and town treasurers in the United States
People from Dane County, Wisconsin
Prussian emigrants to the United States
Wisconsin city council members
1833 births
1923 deaths
Farmers from Wisconsin
People from Bitburg-Prüm
People from Sauk City, Wisconsin
Democratic Party members of the Wisconsin State Assembly